Laurent Pic (born 2 August 1964) is a French diplomat who currently serves as ambassador to Japan.

He was born in Paris and graduated from Sciences Po and INALCO. As a diplomat, he has held postings at the permanent missions of France to the UN and the EU, and has served as an adviser to Pierre Moscovici and Jean-Marc Ayrault. He was ambassador to the Netherlands from 2014–16 and was appointed ambassador to Japan in June 2017.

He is a knight of the National Order of Merit, and of the Légion d'honneur. He also granted the Order of the Rising Sun by Japanese Foreign Minister Toshimitsu Motegi on September 15, 2020.

References 

1964 births
Diplomats from Paris
Ambassadors of France to Japan
Ambassadors of France to the Netherlands
Living people
Knights of the Ordre national du Mérite
Chevaliers of the Légion d'honneur
Recipients of the Order of the Rising Sun